The 2022 Barnet London Borough Council election took place on 5 May 2022, alongside local elections in the other London boroughs and elections to local authorities across the United Kingdom.  All 63 members of Barnet London Borough Council were elected. The Labour Party took overall control, winning 41 of the seats to the Conservative Party's 22. This was the first time Labour had won the council outright; previously, the Conservatives had always won the most seats, usually with an overall majority. 

In the previous election in 2018, the Conservative Party maintained its longstanding control of the council, winning 38 out of the 63 seats with the Labour Party forming the council opposition with the remaining 25 seats. The 2022 election took place under new election boundaries, but the number of councillors remaining at 63.

Background

History 

The thirty-two London boroughs were established in 1965 by the London Government Act 1963. They are the principal authorities in Greater London and have responsibilities including education, housing, planning, highways, social services, libraries, recreation, waste, environmental health and revenue collection. Some of the powers are shared with the Greater London Authority, which also manages passenger transport, police, and fire.

Barnet has generally been controlled by the Conservative Party since its establishment, with a period of no overall control between 1994 and 2002. The Labour Party has held seats in the borough consistently, and the Liberal Democrats have won seats in ten of the fifteen previous council elections. In the most recent election in 2018, the Conservatives won 38 seats and Labour won 25, with the Conservatives receiving 45.5% and Labour receiving 39.0% of the overall vote. Although neither won any seats, the Liberal Democrats won 9.2% of the vote and the Green Party won 6.2% of the vote across the borough. The council had been considered a target for Labour, but the party lost seats, with the defeated Labour councillor Adam Langleben citing antisemitism in the Labour Party. His assessment was shared by Barry Rawlings, the leader of the Labour group on the council. The incumbent leader of the council is the Conservative Daniel Thomas, who has held the role since 2019.

Council term 
The Labour councillor for Underhill Jessica Brayne left the Labour Party in February 2019 over antisemitism in the Labour Party, the party's approach to Brexit and the leadership of Jeremy Corbyn. She later joined the Liberal Democrats. The Conservative councillor for Garden Suburb, Gabriel Rozenberg, defected to the Liberal Democrats in September 2019 due to the party's support of Brexit and the election of Boris Johnson as the party's leader. In September 2020, the Conservative councillor for Edgware, Brian Gordon, died. Due to the COVID-19 pandemic, a by-election could not be held until May 2021. The seat was won the Conservative candidate, Nick Nearing-Smith. In April 2021, the Labour councillor Jo Cooper resigned her East Barnet seat to focus on her work for the NHS. Another by-election was held in May 2021 alongside that year's London mayoral election and London Assembly election. The Conservative candidate, Nicole Richer, a project manager and school governor, won the seat, increasing the Conservative majority on the council. Later in May 2021, the Conservative councillor for Childs Hill, Shimon Ryde, changed his affiliation to independent "to deal with a personal matter". In July 2021, three Jewish Conservative councillors failed to be reselected by their party as candidates for the 2022 election.

Along with most other London boroughs, Barnet was subject to a boundary review ahead of the 2022 election. The Local Government Boundary Commission for England concluded that the council should maintain sixty-three seats, but produced new election boundaries following a period of consultation.

Campaign 
Barnet had been the top target council for Labour to win in London in 2014 and 2018; in neither time was the party successful. It was again mooted as a potential gain for the party in 2022, with the Conservative peer Robert Hayward saying that his party risked losing control of it in the wake of the partygate scandal. Jewish News reported that Labour hoped to do well in the election, possibly winning control of the council, saying that the election "will give the community the chance to offer a clear sign of how impressed they are with Starmer’s efforts to kick the antisemites out". The Evening Standard reported that 15% of residents in the borough were estimated to be Jewish. Nick Bowes, the chief executive of the Centre for London, wrote that the result "will reveal how successfully Keir Starmer has shaken off Jeremy Corbyn’s toxic legacy on antisemitism". Labour launched their London local election campaign in High Barnet.

Transport for London's plans to build housing on some station car parks were considered a potential issue in the election. The Conservative councillor Helene Richman defected to the Liberal Democrats in April 2022. She said "the Conservatives are letting inequality rise and living standards drop. They have given up on communities like ours". The Conservative council leader Daniel Thomas said there had been complaints about her conduct.

Labour and the Conservatives were standing a full slate of 63 candidates, the Liberal Democrats were standing 46 candidates in 18 wards, the Greens were standing one candidate in each of the 24 wards, four independents were standing in three wards, the Women's Equality Party are standing four candidates in four wards and Rejoin EU were standing three candidates in three wards.

Electoral process 
Barnet, as with London borough councils, elects all of its councillors at once every four years, with the previous election having taken place in 2018. The election took place by multi-member first-past-the-post voting, with each ward being represented by two or three councillors. Electors will have as many votes as there are councillors to be elected in their ward, with the top two or three being elected. There are fifteen wards with three councillors and nine with two councillors.

All registered electors (British, Irish, Commonwealth and European Union citizens) living in London aged 18 or over were entitled to vote in the election. People who live at two addresses in different councils, such as university students with different term-time and holiday addresses, are entitled to be registered for and vote in elections in both local authorities. Voting in-person at polling stations will take place from 7:00 to 22:00 on election day, and voters will be able to apply for postal votes or proxy votes in advance of the election.

Previous council composition

Election results 

|}
Note: Votes and percentages are based on the top candidate for each party in each ward.

Ward results 
Ward results are as provided by Barnet Council. Provisional turnout for the whole borough was 97,480, 37.9%. Incumbent councillors are marked with an asterisk (*).

Barnet Vale

Brunswick Park

Burnt Oak

Childs Hill

Colindale North

Colindale South

Cricklewood

East Barnet

East Finchley

Edgware

Edgwarebury

Finchley Church End

Friern Barnet

Garden Suburb

Golders Green

Hendon

High Barnet

Mill Hill

Totteridge and Woodside

Underhill

West Finchley

West Hendon

Whetstone

Woodhouse

2022-2026 by elections

References

External links
Barnet Council, new ward boundaries

Council elections in the London Borough of Barnet
Barnet